Walcott Névé is a névé, about  in area, bounded by the Marshall Mountains, Lewis Cliff and Mount Sirius. Named by the Northern Party of the New Zealand Geological Survey Antarctic Expedition (NZGSAE) (1961–62) for Richard Walcott, party leader and geologist.

Snow fields of the Ross Dependency
Shackleton Coast
Névés of Antarctica